The London and North Eastern Railway (LNER) Thompson Class B2 was a class of 4-6-0 steam locomotive.  It was introduced in 1945 as a two-cylinder rebuild (with diagram 100A boiler) of the three-cylinder LNER Class B17.  Ten were rebuilt from Class B17 but no more were rebuilt because of the success of the LNER Thompson Class B1.

Numbering
The LNER renumbered its locomotive stock during the period that these locomotives were being rebuilt, so some were renumbered at the time that they were rebuilt, some before rebuilding, and some after rebuilding. The renumbering plan for class B2 was the same as for class B17: in each case the first two digits were altered from 28 to 16. Thus 2803 became 1603 at rebuilding in October 1946; 2807 had already become 1607 (December 1946) prior to rebuilding in May 1947; and 2814 (rebuilt November 1946) became 1614 in December 1946. Between 1948 and 1950, British Railways increased these numbers by 60000; no. 61644 was so renumbered at the time of its rebuilding in March 1949.

Names
The rebuilt locomotives kept their names:
 2803 ((6)1603) Framlingham
 2807 ((6)1607) Blickling
 2814 ((6)1614) Castle Hedingham
 2815 ((6)1615) Culford Hall
 2816 ((6)1616) Fallodon
 2817 ((6)1617) Ford Castle
 2832 ((6)1632) Belvoir Castle
 2839 ((6)1639) Norwich City
 2844 ((6)1644) Earlham Hall
 2871 ((6)1671) Manchester City

Renaming

Two of the locomotives were renamed. No. 1671 was the official Royal engine and for this purpose it was renamed Royal Sovereign in April 1946. 

The second renaming occurred after the withdrawal of 61671 in September 1958: in October, the name Royal Sovereign was transferred to no. 61632, which then became the official Royal engine. All members of the class were scrapped.

Operation
There were three sets of drivers and firemen allocated specifically to work the "Royal" engines and they did not work unless operated by one of these teams.

Other than the two locomotives allocated to Cambridge, the remaining locomotives were mainly allocated to Colchester and were predominantly used on services between Liverpool Street and Clacton. Many publications list "B17/B2" together and consider the types interchangeable which may lead to the type being overlooked; a list of locomotives allocated to Colchester in 1951 and labelled as "B2/B17" shows eight B2s and no B17s.

Due to the size of the turntables on the Great Eastern section, locomotives were sometimes used with tenders that were shorter than those originally designed. At least one B2 was recorded as being paired with a tender of NER origin rather than the longer B17 tender.

The last B2 was withdrawn in 1959.

References

Citations

References

Further reading

External links 

 The Thompson B2 4-6-0s LNER encyclopedia

B02 Thompson
4-6-0 locomotives
2′C h2 locomotives
Railway locomotives introduced in 1945
Scrapped locomotives
Standard gauge steam locomotives of Great Britain
Rebuilt locomotives